Ryan Clayton Bank (born April 27, 1981) is an Emerging Technology Expert and Social Innovation Evangelist.  Bank is the Founder of Social Intelligence Corporation, a start-up company that enables governments and corporate clients to gather Social and Open Source Intelligence.  Besides advising governments and corporations on the use of Emerging Technology, Bank is also a featured speaker both nationally and internationally on the organizational value of Innovation.

Prior to founding Social Intelligence Corporation, Bank was an award-winning television producer, new media expert and President of Clayton Entertainment, a Chicago, Illinois based media production and distribution company.

Early life 
Bank is the son of Charles Nicky Bank, a financial industry executive, and Charlotte Bank, a homemaker.  He attended Bannockburn Elementary School and then Deerfield High School (Illinois) in Deerfield, Illinois, where he first started in media production.  While in high school, he received numerous national and international media awards.  Ryan Bank graduated cum laude from the School of Communications through the School of Continuing Studies of Northwestern University where he was inducted into the Alpha Sigma Lambda society.

Clayton Entertainment 
Ryan Bank served as the president of Clayton Entertainment, a media production company based in Chicago, Illinois.  Clayton Entertainment was founded as a media production company and has worked on projects ranging from music videos, television programs, media production and now New Media.

Clayton Entertainment has become involved with the production and distribution of new media projects with platforms such as Hulu.

A Private War 
In 2001, Bank produced a documentary and feature film, A Private War, about the life of Dr. Eugene Lazowski.  Lazowski saved the lives of about 8,000 Jews in the town of Rozwadów as well as in surrounding villages by creating a fake typhus epidemic during World War II. He used medical science to save Jews and other Poles from being deported to the Nazi concentration camps.

Haiti earthquake
Bank developed a system for the United States Coast Guard that used social media monitoring to find survivors after the 2010 Haiti earthquake in Port-au-Prince, Haiti.

Based on an extensive set of tools — including the remarkable work of several NGOs and Private Volunteer Organizations — he was able to monitor hundreds of thousands of messages coming from Haiti, looking for those that needed immediate rescue.  Upon receiving distress messages, Bank worked with military responders to coordinate message traffic with information from other sources.  Ultimately, this intelligence would be passed to commanders in the field and rescue teams were launched to the location.

References

External links 
 Personal Site
 Social Intelligence Corp Site
 

Living people
1981 births
People from Lake Forest, Illinois
People from Bannockburn, Illinois